The Tocklai Tea Research Institute is a prime tea research institute for the development of tea and its agricultural practices.

See also
History of tea in India
Assam tea

References

External links
Tocklai Tea Research Institute website

Research institutes in Assam
Tea industry in Assam
Education in Jorhat district
1911 establishments in India